Deccan TV is a Telugu TV channel in the Indian state of Telangana that started airing on 6 August 2014. The company is based in Hyderabad, Telangana, India.

The channel focuses on regional news as well as national and international news and arts and culture. Apart from news, the channel also has some programs of own production.

Programs

Parampara – Reflects arts and culture of Telangana
One to One – Discussions with famous editor Satish Chandar
Let Us Think – Discussions on Current topics
Jobs and Career – Helpful to the unemployed
Lead the Life – Helpful to the people who seek self-employment
Raithu – Useful to formers

References

External links

Official website (English)

Television stations in Hyderabad